The Colligan River is a fast-flowing river in Ireland, flowing through County Waterford. It is reputed to be one of the fastest in Europe.

Course
The Colligan River rises in the Monavullagh Mountains.
It flows southwards under the Scart Bridge. It passes under the N72 at Kildangan and turns eastwards into a wide estuary at Dungarvan, where it is bridged by the N25 (The Bypass) and R911 (The Causeway) before entering the Celtic Sea.

Recreation
The Colligan River is a noted salmon and trout fishery. It is also used for whitewater kayaking.

References

See also
Rivers of Ireland

Rivers of County Waterford